In music, live instrumentation is the use of acoustic and electronic musical instruments in live music and recording rather than DJing, sampling, and other recording techniques.

Music production
Music performance
Sound recording